The 1920 Ole Miss Rebels football team represented the University of Mississippi during the 1920 college football season.

Schedule

References

Ole Miss
Ole Miss Rebels football seasons
Ole Miss Rebels football